China is the world leader in lettuce production, producing half of the world's lettuce. Stem lettuce is grown in the country and the stems are prepared as a cooked vegetable. According to estimates given by the Food and Agriculture Organization (FAO) in 2006, China produced around 11,005,000 metric tonnes of lettuce on 500,250 hectares of land. Taiwan is also a producer of good quality head lettuce, which is an export commodity.

History
China first started growing lettuce (Lactuta sativa L.) in the seventh century, according to one source, although another source writes that lettuce was introduced earlier, in the fifth century. It is not quite clear as to how lettuce got to China. China accounts for around half of the world's total lettuce production.

Agriculture
Most of the lettuce produced in China is purchased and consumed within the country.

The common types of lettuce grown are the Butterhead (Lactuca sativa var. capitata), the Crisphead (Lactuca sativa var. capitata), the Looseleaf (Lactuca sativa var. crispa), the Romaine (Lactuca sativa var. longifolia), and the Celtuce. Celtuce is grown widely in the country and its stems are prepared as a cooked vegetable. Celtuce (Lactuca sativa var. angustana), an endemic plant of China, is also called stem lettuce. The name is derived from two words “celery” and “lettuce.” It is succulent, has thick stem and tender leaves. The plant grows to a height of 10 to 12 inches and has leaves at the end, similar to that of lettuce. Its skin tastes bitter, and hence is removed by paring it and leaving only the green core of it which is soft and translucent.

Prickly lettuce or China lettuce (Lactuca serriola) is also a variety grown in waste lands along roadsides, yards and gardens. It is an irrigated crop that is suited to grow on light or dry soils.

In Taiwan, head lettuce is an export crop (40–50% produce exported) grown in the sub-tropical mountainous area, which is suitable (due to its cool climate) for its cultivation. This crop is a good source of vitamin A and folic acid. It is green in colour and has crisp leaves and is of the compact variety. Though low in calories it is a vitamin and mineral supplement. Stem lettuce provides vitamin C and also calcium.

Culinary dishes

In China, lettuce is not eaten in a raw form of salad. The preferred common usage is in plain form as stir-fried  (cooked for a short time) and occasionally mixed with mushroom and other vegetables, and well spiced with garnishing. It is also steamed individually. It is also used in combination with meat dishes such as “Sliced Pork Stir Fried with Lettuce.” Lettuce soups are also common, along with fish or minced chicken. For this preparation, fresh and crisp lettuce is chosen and the soup is consumed hot and not allowed to go tasteless. Other varieties of dishes are “Lettuce and fermented Bean Cake” and  “Clear Simmered Bean Card with Lettuce and Cellophane Noodles.” Stem lettuce, which originated in China, is cooked and used as a food item.

Culture
It is common belief in China that lettuce is a symbol for wealth and good luck. It is a festive food during birthdays, New Year's Day and several other festive occasions. Celtuce is pickled and used as a side dish during meals.

Gallery

Notes

References

Agricultural production in China by commodity
Lettuce